Lake Orion Community Schools is a school district headquartered in Lake Orion, Michigan, serving students from the Village of Lake Orion and Orion Township; and small parts of Oxford Township, Oakland Township, and Independence Township.

Schools

High schools
 Lake Orion High School

Middle schools
 Oakview Middle School
 Scripps Middle School
 Waldon Middle School

Elementary schools
 Carpenter Elementary School
 Orion Oaks Elementary School
 Paint Creek Elementary School
 Blanche Sims Elementary School
 Webber Elementary School
 Stadium Drive Elementary School of the Arts

External links
 Lake Orion Community Schools

Some of these schools Have very good ratings.

School districts in Michigan
Education in Oakland County, Michigan